Aq Bolagh-e Olya may refer to:
 Aq Bolagh-e Olya, West Azerbaijan
 Aq Bolagh-e Olya, Zanjan